Dwight Emerson Gregory Whylie (June 7, 1936 in Kingston, Jamaica - September 15, 2002 in Barbados) was a broadcaster and radio announcer.

Career
In 1961, Whylie was the first black radio announcer hired by the British Broadcasting Corporation. In 1973, he became the general manager of Jamaica Broadcasting Corporation, where he remained until 1976.

In 1977, he joined the Canadian Broadcasting Corporation, where he remained until 1997.

Family

He was the brother of noted Jamaican musician Marjorie Whylie.

References

1936 births
2002 deaths
People from Kingston, Jamaica
Canadian radio news anchors
Jamaican emigrants to Canada
Black Canadian broadcasters
CBC Radio hosts